Zenonina is a genus of spiders in the family Lycosidae. It was first described in 1898 by Simon. , it contains 6 species.

Species
Zenonina comprises the following species:
Zenonina albocaudata Lawrence, 1952
Zenonina fusca Caporiacco, 1941
Zenonina mystacina Simon, 1898
Zenonina rehfousi Lessert, 1933
Zenonina squamulata Strand, 1908
Zenonina vestita Simon, 1898

References

Lycosidae
Araneomorphae genera
Spiders of Africa